Barry Crago is a Wyoming politician.

Career
Crago served as Deputy County Attorney for Johnson County, Wyoming from 2008 to 2011. In 2013, Crago began to serve in this position again, and has been serving in this position ever since. On August 18, 2020, when incumbent, state representative Richard Tass, sought re-election, Crago defeated Tass in the Republican primary. On November 3, 2020, Crago was elected to the Wyoming House of Representatives seat which represents the 40th district, uncontested. On January 4, 2021, Crago was sworn into this position, and he currently holds this office.

References

Living people
Republican Party members of the Wyoming House of Representatives
People from Johnson County, Wyoming
Wyoming lawyers
21st-century American lawyers
21st-century American politicians
Year of birth missing (living people)